Antonio Veić was the reigning champion but did not defend his title as he retired from professional tennis.

Igor Marcondes won the title after defeating Juan Bautista Torres 3–6, 7–5, 6–1 in the final.

Seeds

Draw

Finals

Top half

Bottom half

References

External links
Main draw
Qualifying draw

Aberto Santa Catarina de Tenis - 1
Aberto Santa Catarina de Tenis